Magnus Andersen may refer to:

 Magnus Andersen (politician) (1916–1994), Norwegian politician
 Magnus Andersen (footballer) (born 1986), Norwegian footballer
 Magnus Kofod Andersen (born 1999), Danish footballer

See also
Magnus Andersson (disambiguation)